Kim Si-woo (born 28 June 1995), also known as Si Woo Kim, is a South Korean professional golfer who plays on the PGA Tour. He won the 2017 Players Championship to become the youngest ever winner of the event at age 21.

Professional career
Kim finished tied for 20th at the 2012 PGA Tour Qualifying School. He was only 17 years, 5 months, 6 days old at the time, the youngest player to graduate from the PGA Tour's qualifying school. Due to PGA Tour rules, he could not become a PGA Tour member until he turned 18, midway through the 2013 season. In eight PGA Tour starts in 2013, Kim missed the cut in seven tournaments and withdrew from the eighth. He also played in seven Web.com Tour events in 2013, making four cuts.

Kim played on the Web.com Tour in 2014, making 15 of 19 cuts including a third-place finish at the Cleveland Open. In 2015, he won his first Web.com Tour event, the Stonebrae Classic, in July. He was the second-youngest winner in Web.com Tour history, after Jason Day. He finished 2015 in tenth place in the Web.com Tour money list, to earn a place on the PGA Tour for 2016.

His first win on the PGA Tour came at the 2016 Wyndham Championship. At 21, he was the season's youngest winner. His second win on the PGA Tour came at the 2017 Players Championship, beating Ian Poulter and Louis Oosthuizen by three-shots with a bogey-free 69 in his final round, becoming the second Korean to win the title after K. J. Choi in 2011. Ranked 73rd in the world prior to the Players Championship, Kim was the second-lowest ranked player to win the tournament, with 2002 winner Craig Perks ranked outside 200th before his win. Kim moved up to 28th in the world after the win.

Kim lost in a sudden-death playoff at the 2018 RBC Heritage in April. He had held the sole lead for large portions of the final round, but shot three over on the back nine, missing a series of makeable putts, including at the last to win the tournament outright, to fall into a playoff. He lost on the third extra hole of the playoff, when Satoshi Kodaira holed a lengthy birdie putt on the par-3 17th.

In January 2021, Kim won The American Express in La Quinta, California. Kim shot a final round 8-under 64 to win by one stroke over Patrick Cantlay and claim his third PGA Tour title. In August later that year, Kim tied for the lead with five other players after 72 holes at the Wyndham Championship. Kevin Kisner took the title in the playoff.

In September 2022, Kim was selected for the International team in the 2022 Presidents Cup; he won three and lost one of the four matches he played.

In January 2023, Kim won the Sony Open in Hawaii. He birdied the final two holes to win by one shot over Hayden Buckley. It was his fourth PGA Tour victory.

Professional wins (5)

PGA Tour wins (4)

PGA Tour playoff record (0–3)

Web.com Tour wins (1)

Web.com Tour playoff record (1–0)

Results in major championships
Results not in chronological order in 2020.

CUT = missed the half-way cut
WD = withdrew
"T" indicates a tie for a place
NT = No tournament due to COVID-19 pandemic

Summary

Most consecutive cuts made – 3 (twice)
Longest streak of top-10s – 0

The Players Championship

Wins (1)

Results timeline

"T" indicates a tie for a place
WD = withdrew
C = Cancelled after the first round due to the COVID-19 pandemic

Results in World Golf Championships

1Cancelled due to COVID-19 pandemic

QF, R16, R32, R64 = Round in which player lost in match play
"T" = Tied
NT = No tournament
Note that the Championship and Invitational were discontinued from 2022.

Team appearances
Amateur
Eisenhower Trophy (representing South Korea): 2012

Professional
Presidents Cup (representing the International team): 2017, 2022
World Cup (representing South Korea): 2018

See also
2012 PGA Tour Qualifying School graduates
2015 Web.com Tour Finals graduates

References

External links

South Korean male golfers
PGA Tour golfers
Olympic golfers of South Korea
Golfers at the 2020 Summer Olympics
Korn Ferry Tour graduates
Yonsei University alumni
Golfers from Seoul
1995 births
Living people